Nanjing means 'southern capital' and is the name of the current capital of Jiangsu Province and a former capital of China. It was formerly romanized as Nanking or Nankin.

Nanjing or Nanking may also refer to:

Nanjing (Liao Dynasty), the name for Beijing during the Liao dynasty (907–1125)
Nanjing, a historical name for Kaifeng
Nanjing, a historical name for Shangqiu during the Northern Song dynasty
Taipei, the current capital of the Republic of China(Taiwan)
Nanjing County, in Zhangzhou, Fujian, China
Nan Jing (Chinese medicine) (難經)
Nanking (1938 film), a Japanese documentary film
Nanking (2007 film), a film about the 1937 Nanking Massacre
Nanking Cherry, a deciduous shrub
Kobe Chinatown also known as Nankin-machi or Nanjing Town
2078 Nanking, an asteroid

Nankin may also refer to:
Nankin bantam, a bantam breed of chicken

 Nankin-machi, also called “Nanjingtown” is a Chinatown in Kobe, Japan

See also
 Nanking (disambiguation)
 Nanjing Incident (disambiguation)
 Battles of Nanking, various battles